Clay is a town in Onondaga County, New York, United States. As of the 2010 census, its population was 58,206, making it Syracuse's most populous suburb. The town was named after American attorney and statesman Henry Clay.

Clay is north of Syracuse. It is the largest town in the county, contains part of the village of North Syracuse, and is a suburb of Syracuse. It contains the major retail strip of Syracuse's northern suburbs, along New York State Route 31 (NY-31), including the currently defunct Great Northern Mall.

History
Prior to European settlement in the area, Clay was inhabited by the Onondaga Nation, part of the Iroquois Confederacy, some of whose descendants still live in the area today.
Clay was within the Central New York Military Tract. The town was first settled by outsiders around 1791 and was previously known as West Cicero. The Town of Clay was formed in 1827 from the Town of Cicero, one of the original townships of the military tract.

Geography

The northern town line is the border of Oswego County, marked by the Oneida River. The Seneca River marks the western town line. Both these rivers join into the Oswego River near the community of Three Rivers. The renovated Erie Canal follows the rivers around the border of Clay.

New York State Route 31 is an east–west highway through the town. New York State Route 481 intersects NY-31 west of Euclid.

Communities and locations in the Town of Clay

 Bayberry — A suburban residential community in the town
 Belgium — A hamlet on NY-31 near the western town line
 Cherry Estates — A hamlet near the eastern town line
 Clay — The hamlet of Clay is located on NY-31.
 Country Meadow — A very large (and still-growing) neighborhood off of Caughdenoy Rd, site of the 2008 Parade of Homes
 Elmcrest — A hamlet in the southwest part of Clay
 Euclid— A hamlet in the northern part of the town on NY-31
 Fairway East — A sprawling subdivision linking Morgan Road with Soule Road. There are many streets and approximately 500 homes.
 Gatewood — A neighborhood in the eastern part of the town off of Maple Road. Consists of three streets and 72 houses.
 Great Northern Mall — A large regional mall at the junction of routes NY-31 and NY-481. Built in Clay in 1988, it is one of three major enclosed malls in the Syracuse area.
 Kimbrook — A suburban residential community
 Lawton Valley Hunt — A very large housing development between Caughdenoy Road, NY-31, and Lawton Road. The final phase of the development has recently been completed.
 Lynelle Meadows — A suburban residential community
 Moyers Corners — A hamlet on NY-31 near the western town line, east of Belgium
 North Syracuse — The Village of North Syracuse is mostly within the Town of Clay.
 Pinegate North & South — A suburban residential community located across from Soule Road Middle and Elementary Schools
 Rodger Corner — A hamlet south of Clay village
 The Farmstead — A new upscale neighborhood off of Maple Road, site of the 2014 Parade of Homes
 Three Rivers — A hamlet at the western town line at the junction of the Oneida, Oswego, and Seneca Rivers
 Willow Stream — A suburban residential community
 Woodard— A hamlet in the southwest part of Clay
 Youngs — A hamlet north of Clay village

Demographics

As of the census of 2000, there were 58,805 people, 22,294 households, and 15,940 families residing in the town.  The population density was 1,224.9 people per square mile (472.9/km2).  There were 23,398 housing units at an average density of 487.4 per square mile (188.2/km2).  The racial makeup of the town was 92.13% White, 3.50% African-American, 0.47% Native American, 2.01% Asian, 0.02% Pacific Islander, 0.38% from other races, and 1.48% from two or more races. Hispanic or Latino people of any race were 1.39% of the population.

There were 22,294 households, out of which 38.0% had children under the age of 18 living with them, 56.9% were married couples living together, 11.0% had a female householder with no husband present, and 28.5% were non-families. 22.3% of all households were made up of individuals, and 6.4% had someone living alone who was 65 years of age or older.  The average household size was 2.63 and the average family size was 3.11.

In the town, the population was spread out, with 27.7% under the age of 18, 7.3% from 18 to 24, 32.5% from 25 to 44, 23.1% from 45 to 64, and 9.3% who were 65 years of age or older.  The median age was 35 years. For every 100 females, there were 93.0 males.  For every 100 females age 18 and over, there were 90.1 males.

The median income for a household in the town was $90,412, and the median income for a family was $97,493. Males had a median income of $40,387 versus $27,996 for females. The per capita income for the town was $22,011.  About 4.1% of families and 5.7% of the population were below the poverty line, including 7.5% of those under age 18 and 6.2% of those age 65 or over.

Infrastructure

Fire departments
Clay is covered by Moyers Corners Fire Department and Clay Fire Department, with small sections covered by North Syracuse, Caughdneoy, and Brewerton Fire Departments.

Police Department
Clay maintained its own police department until 2008, when the Clay Police Department merged with the Onondaga County Sheriff's Office.

Notable people
Stacey Castor, convicted murderer
Patrick Corbin, pitcher for the Washington Nationals
Matilda Maranda Crawford, newspaper correspondent 
Richard Gere, actor
James W. Ostrander, politician
Jack Smith, attorney

See also 

Syracuse, New York
Weedsport

References

External links 

  Clay history and genealogy links
 

Syracuse metropolitan area
Towns in Onondaga County, New York